José Fernando Fumagalli (born 5 October 1977 in Monte Alto, São Paulo), known simply as Fumagalli, is a Brazilian retired footballer who played as an attacking midfielder.

A Santos youth graduate, Fumagalli spent most of his professional career with Guarani.

Career statistics

Honours
 Santos
 Torneio Rio-São Paulo: 1997

 América-SP
 Campeonato Paulista Série A2: 1999

 Corinthians
 Copa do Brasil: 2002
 Torneio Rio-São Paulo: 2002
 Campeonato Paulista: 2003

 Sport
 Campeonato Pernambucano: 2006, 2007, 2009

 Vasco da Gama
 Campeonato Brasileiro Série B: 2009

 Guarani
 Campeonato Paulista Série A2: 2018

References

External links

1977 births
Living people
Footballers from São Paulo (state)
Brazilian people of Italian descent
Brazilian footballers
Campeonato Brasileiro Série A players
Campeonato Brasileiro Série B players
Campeonato Brasileiro Série C players
Associação Ferroviária de Esportes players
Santos FC players
Brazilian expatriate footballers
Expatriate footballers in Japan
J1 League players
Tokyo Verdy players
América Futebol Clube (SP) players
Guarani FC players
Sport Club Corinthians Paulista players
Esporte Clube Santo André players
Marília Atlético Clube players
FC Seoul players
Fortaleza Esporte Clube players
Sport Club do Recife players
CR Vasco da Gama players
Al-Rayyan SC players
Guaratinguetá Futebol players
Expatriate footballers in Qatar
Expatriate footballers in South Korea
Brazilian expatriate sportspeople in South Korea
Qatar Stars League players
Association football midfielders